Elmer Kloos (born February 15, 1908, date of death unknown) was a German boxer who competed in the 1928 Summer Olympics.

In 1928, he was eliminated in the second round of the featherweight class after losing his fight to Lucian Biquet.

External links
Elmer Kloos' profile at Sports Reference.com

1908 births
Year of death missing
Featherweight boxers
Olympic boxers of Germany
Boxers at the 1928 Summer Olympics
German male boxers